Wilhelm Steudel (1829, Oberurbach – 1903, Stuttgart) was a German physician, ornithologist and entomologist who specialised in Lepidoptera. He described the moth Rhigognostis incarnatella (Steudel, 1873) as Eine neue Plutella – Entomologische Zeitung Stettin 34: 340 - 342. His other papers were published in Jahreshefte des Vereins für vaterländische Naturkunde in Württemberg. Steudel was a member of the Entomological Society of Stettin. His collection of Palearctic microlepidoptera is curated by the State Museum of Natural History Stuttgart.

References
Harde, K. W. 1969: 100 Jahre Entomologischer Verein Stuttgart. Stuttgart: Entomologischer Verein Stuttgart 1869 e.V:, 1-15 S., pp. 11.
Zobodat
Hausenbalas, D. 2006 Korrekturen und Ergänzungen zur Mikrolepidopterenfauna Baden-Württembergs und angrenzender Gebiete. Mitteilungen des Entomologischen Vereins Stuttgart 41 (1/2), 3-28 pdf Zobodat
Furrington, H. 2002 Die Vögel im Stadt- und Landkreis Heilbronn aus historischer Zeit bis 2001. - Ornithologische Jahreshefte für Baden-Württemberg 18 (1): 1–304. 

German ornithologists
German lepidopterists
1903 deaths
1829 births